Playa was an American R&B/hip hop group, formed in 1990. The original lineup consisted of Jawaan "Smoke E. Digglera" Peacock, Benjamin "Digital Black" Bush and Stephen "Static Major" Garrett. Playa is best known for their 1998 hit song, "Cheers 2 U", produced by longtime collaborator Timbaland. Static was notable for being a successful songwriter of hit singles and album tracks for artists such as Ginuwine, Aaliyah, Truth Hurts, Lil Wayne and Brandy.

In 1995, Playa contributed to Jodeci's album The Show, the After Party, the Hotel

Discography

Albums 
 1995: Untitled Album (unreleased) (Swing Mob)
 1998: Cheers 2 U (Def Jam)
 2001: Throwback Legends (Unreleased) (Blackground/Def Jam)
 2003: Never Too Late (shelved) (Blackground/Def Jam)
 2009: Unreleased Compilation

Singles
 1995: "Ridin' Around" (feat. Timbaland)
 1995: "Gotta Feel Tha Vibe" (feat. Timbaland & Sista)
 1995: "Come On Girl"
 1995: "B Funk" (feat. Timbaland & Magoo)
 1995: "Pass Da Light" (feat. Timbaland)
 1997: "Don't Stop the Music"
 1998: "Cheers 2 U"
 1997: "I Gotta Know" (featuring Foxy Brown, from the How to Be a Player soundtrack)
 1998: "Your Dress" (from the Dr. Dolittle soundtrack)
 1999: "Playboy Like Me" (from the Blue Streak soundtrack)
 2000: "Woozy" (from the Romeo Must Die soundtrack)
 2001: "Incense Burning"
 2002: "Wrong Side of tha Bed"
 2002: "Lust"
 2003: "Island Girl" (feat. Timbaland)
 2003: "I'm Available"
 2003: "Never Too Late"
 2003: "Weekend" (feat. Lil' Flip)
 2009: "On the Downside" (Smoke E. Digglera feat. Static Major)
 2009: "The Luv That I Bring" (feat. BlackFace)

Soundtrack and compilation contributions
 1997: "Joy", from Welcome to Our World by Timbaland & Magoo
 1997: "Smoke in 'Da Air", from Welcome to Our World by Timbaland & Magoo
 1998: "Your Dress", from the Dr. Dolittle soundtrack
 1998: "Birthday", from Tim's Bio, from the Motion Picture: Life from da Bassment by Timbaland
 1999: "Playboy Like Me", from the Blue Streak soundtrack
 2000: "Woozy" from the Romeo Must Die soundtrack
 2001: "Incense Burning" from the Exit Wounds soundtrack

References

External links
 
 

Def Jam Recordings artists
Swing Mob artists
American contemporary R&B musical groups
American boy bands
Musical groups from Louisville, Kentucky
African-American musical groups
American musical trios
Musical groups established in 1990
1990 establishments in Kentucky